Brian Leslie Aldridge  (30 June 1940 – 9 December 2021) was a New Zealand cricket umpire. 

Aldridge was one of the umpires in the 1992 Cricket World Cup final between England and Pakistan. At his death, he was still the only New Zealander to officiate in a World Cup final. He stood in 26 Test matches and 45 ODI games between 1986 and 1995. As well as 20 Tests in New Zealand, he umpired three Tests in Sri Lanka, two in Pakistan and one in Zimbabwe. In all, he umpired 84 first-class matches between 1979 and 1995.

In 1997, Aldridge became New Zealand Cricket's first-ever full-time umpire manager, a post he held until his retirement in 2008. He was awarded the Queen's Service Medal in the 2012 New Year Honours, for services to cricket administration. Outside cricket, he worked as a builder.

Aldridge died in Christchurch on 9 December 2021, at the age of 81.

See also
 List of Test cricket umpires
 List of One Day International cricket umpires

References

1940 births
2021 deaths
New Zealand Test cricket umpires
New Zealand One Day International cricket umpires
Recipients of the Queen's Service Medal
Sportspeople from Christchurch
New Zealand cricketers